"All That Counts Is Love" is a single released by the British rock band Status Quo in 2005. It was included on the album The Party Ain't Over Yet.

Track listing 
 "All That Counts Is Love" (John David) (Radio Mix) 3:41
 "Belavista Man" (Live) (Parfitt/Edwards) 4:27
 "The Party Ain't Over Yet" (Live) (John David) 3:51

Charts

References 

Status Quo (band) songs
2005 singles
2005 songs
Songs written by John David (musician)